Christophe Sirugue (born 14 August 1966 in Autun, Saône-et-Loire) was a member of the National Assembly of France.  He represents the Saône-et-Loire department,  and is a member of the Socialiste, radical, citoyen et divers gauche.
He is vice-president of the French National Assembly since 2012.

References

1966 births
Living people
People from Autun
Mayors of places in Bourgogne-Franche-Comté
Socialist Party (France) politicians
Deputies of the 13th National Assembly of the French Fifth Republic
Deputies of the 14th National Assembly of the French Fifth Republic
Government ministers of France